Sir Henry Edwards, 1st Baronet  (20 July 1812 – 23 April 1886) was an English Conservative politician who sat in the House of Commons in two periods between 1847 and 1869.

Edwards was born at Pye Nest in Halifax, Yorkshire, and was the son of Henry Lees Edwards and Lea Priestley. He was J.P. and Deputy Lieutenant for the West Riding of Yorkshire and reached the rank of Colonel in the 2nd West Yorkshire Regiment Yeomanry Cavalry.

In 1847 Edwards was elected Member of Parliament (MP) for Halifax and held the seat until 1852. In 1857 he was elected MP for Beverley and was re-elected in subsequent elections. He was created a baronet of Pye Nest on 3 August 1866. After the 1868 general election the election was declared void on 11 Mar 1869. No writ was issued to replace the members and the constituency was disenfranchised by an Act which received Royal assent on 4 July 1870. Edwards was High Sheriff of Yorkshire in 1872. In 1875, he was appointed by the Freemasons as Provincial Grand Master of West Yorkshire.
     
Edwards died in 1886 at Pye Nest at the age of 73.

Edwards married Maria Churchill Coster, daughter of Thomas Coster, on 19 April 1838. He was succeeded in the baronetcy by his son Henry.

References

External links
 

1812 births
1886 deaths
Conservative Party (UK) MPs for English constituencies
UK MPs 1868–1874
UK MPs 1847–1852
UK MPs 1857–1859
UK MPs 1859–1865
UK MPs 1865–1868
Baronets in the Baronetage of the United Kingdom
Companions of the Order of the Bath
High Sheriffs of Yorkshire
Deputy Lieutenants of the West Riding of Yorkshire
West Yorkshire Yeomanry officers
Freemasons of the United Grand Lodge of England